The Verige bridge is a planned bridge in Montenegro that would span the Bay of Kotor, crossing the Verige Strait at its narrowest point. It will be part of the Adriatic Highway (Jadranska magistrala). As of 2007, the planning stage of the bridge is completed, and construction of the bridge can begin upon the providing of the financial means. The project is estimated to cost 48.5 million US dollars. Because the Kotor Bay is a UNESCO World Heritage Site, UNESCO has had some concerns regarding this project.

Following a recommendation of the World Heritage Committee the Government of Montenegro is expected to consider alternative ways of crossing the bay. In particular, a tunnel passage is reported to be under consideration:

References

Bridges in Montenegro
Proposed bridges in Europe
Bay of Kotor